Hembrie, Texas is a ghost town in Crockett County, Texas. It was named for the family of the areas first Postmaster. It maintained a post office from 1890 until 1911 as well as a school during the same time period.

References

Crockett County, Texas
Ghost towns in Texas